Muncy Creek (also known as Big Muncy Creek) is a tributary of the West Branch Susquehanna River in Sullivan County and Lycoming County, at Pennsylvania, in the United States. The creek's discharge averages  at Sonestown, but can be up to a thousand times higher at Muncy. The headwaters of the creek are on the Allegheny Plateau. Rock formations in the watershed include the Chemung Formation and the Catskill Formation.

There are a number of lakes in the watershed of Muncy Creek, including Eagles Mere Lake, Highland Lake, and Beaver Lake. The creek was known as Occohpocheny to Native Americans. The area in its vicinity was settled in 1783. Various other industries and mills were constructed in the creek's vicinity from the late 18th century to the early 20th century. Wild trout naturally reproduce in part of Muncy Creek. Part of the creek is navigable by canoe.

Course

Muncy Creek begins in southeastern Laporte Township, Sullivan County, near its border with Davidson Township, Sullivan County. The creek flows southwest and then west for a short distance before reaching the border between Laporte Township and Davidson Township. It then turns southwest as it begins to follow this border. Shortly afterwards it turns northwest and begins to flow into a valley, then turns west and begins receiving very short tributaries from both sides. Examples of these include Rock Run and Lopez Pond Branch. After picking up Peters Creek, one such tributary, Muncy Creek turns southwest and passes the community of Nordmont, where the tributary Elklick Run flows into it. The creek then turns southwest and later west. Deep Hollow Run then enters the creek, which heads south away from the Laporte Township/Davidson Township border. Upon leaving behind the Laporte Township/Davidson Township border, the creek enters Davidson Township and heads west-southwest, passing a gauging station. After several miles, it reaches the community of Sonestown, where the tributary Big Run flows into it from the north. Muncy Creek then makes a sharp bend south and begins flowing parallel to U.S. Route 220. After a few miles, it passes the community of Muncy Valley and makes a sharp turn south, exiting Davidson Township.

Upon exiting Davidson Township, Sullivan County, Muncy Creek enters Lycoming County and flows along the border between Shrewsbury Township and Penn Township for several miles. It continues following U.S. Route 220 during this time, picking up a few tributaries, including Lick Run. The creek also passes by Glen Mawr and Tivoli during this stretch. Beyond the stretch, in Picture Rocks, the creek crosses Pennsylvania Route 864. Beyond the community, the creek continues south into Wolf Township, leaving its valley passing by the eastern edge of Hughesville. Some distance further on, the creek receives the tributary Sugar Run and some miles later leaves Wolf Township in a southwesterly direction. Upon exiting Wolf Township, the creek enters Muncy Creek Township, where Little Muncy Creek flows into it. Muncy Creek then turns northeast, crossing Pennsylvania Route 405 and turns southwest, crossing Interstate 180. The creek then receives the tributary Wolf Run and immediately afterwards empties into the West Branch Susquehanna River.

Tributaries
Significant tributaries of Muncy Creek include Little Muncy Creek and Wolf Run. Other large tributaries of the creek include Lewis Creek, Rock Run, and Sugar Run. Muncy Creek also has numerous minor tributaries.

Hydrology
The discharge of the creek at Sonestown averages 44.9 cubic feet per second. The osmotic pressure of the stream's waters at this location ranged from less than 1 up to 4 millios-moles per .

The pH of Muncy Creek's waters near Muncy ranged from 7.0 to 7.5 in 2012 and 2013.

There are trace amounts of bromides, phosphorus, orthophosphates, and ammonia in Muncy Creek. All of these occur in concentrations of 0.3 milligrams per liter or less. The minimum nitrate concentration is  milligrams per liter and the maximum is  milligrams per liter.

In 2013, the creek's concentration of manganese was observed to be .

Geography and geology

The headwaters of the creek are more than  higher than its mouth. The headwaters of Muncy Creek are mountainous and are situated on the Allegheny Plateau. The southern edge of the Allegheny Mountain runs from the creek west as far as Lock Haven or Pine Creek. The valley of Muncy Creek is surrounded by scalloped hills. Muncy Creek's course winds significantly, but flows generally southwest.

A narrow belt of the Chemung Formation occurs along Muncy Creek in Shrewsbury Township, Lycoming County. An outcropping of the Catskill Formation also occurs along parts of the creek in Jordan Township, Lycoming County. The Chemung Formation has an outcropping on the creek near Moreland. It consists of shale and sandstone. Red shale is also found on the creek. In general, rock formations consisting of sandstone and shale are found along much of the creek, while rock formations of limestone occur close to its mouth.

The Tombs Run and Muncy Creek Anticline runs parallel to the creek through northern Penn Township, Lycoming County and also enters Sullivan County near the creek. The creek also has a cliff known as Picture Rock on it. An area of boulders on the creek forms a Class 2 rapid. There is a levee on Muncy Creek in Hughesville.

The soils in the valley of Muncy Creek are deep but relatively poor. However, farming was done in the valley in the late 1800s and still is as of the late 1900s. The valley has forested hills on either side. The Morris-Oquaga-Wellsboro soil series is found along the creek in Sullivan County.

The channel of Muncy Creek is sinuous with high streambanks and the creek has cobble and gravel bars. There are a few strainers on the creek.

Watershed

The area of the watershed upstream of Hugesville comprises approximately half of the total watershed. The watershed of the creek occupies parts of Lycoming County, Sullivan County, Columbia County, and Montour County.

There are a number of lakes in the watershed of Muncy Creek. Additionally, Beaver Lake (which has an area of ) is located in the watershed of the tributary Little Muncy creek.

Communities in the watershed of Muncy Creek include Hugesville, Picture Rocks, Lairdsville, and Sonestown. Smaller communities in the creek's watershed include Muncy Valley, Eagles Mere, and Nordmont.

In the late 1800s, the only road in Davidson Township, Sullivan County besides the Susquehanna and Tioga Turnpike passed near Muncy Creek and the settlements along it. The valley of Muncy Creek is largely undeveloped, largely lacking even summer camps.

History
Muncy Creek derives its name from the Munsee Indians. The name sometimes has been spelled "Muncey Creek".

Muncy Creek was known to the Native Americans as Occohpocheny. Historically, Native Americans painted on Picture Rock, a cliff on the creek. Additionally, six Native American lance heads made of stone were found near the creek by Joseph Fahrenbach in the autumn of 1872.

Muncy Creek was settled in 1783 by John Beeber. In 1797, the Willow Grove Mill was built on Muncy Creek in 1797 by Isaac Walton and by the late 1800s, there was a sawmill on the creek in Shrewsbury Township, Lycoming County. A woolen mill was also built on the creek in Wolf Township, Lycoming County in 1842. 
An aqueduct carrying the West Branch Canal once crossed Muncy Creek.

There were also numerous railroad stations on the creek upstream from the community of Picture Rocks. The Reading Railroad also had a bridge over the creek in the past. The creek experienced severe flooding in 1889.

In the early 1900s, many of the sewers in the community of Eagles Mere discharged into tributaries of Muncy Creek, such as Outlet Run. Sewage was also discharged into Muncy Creek in Hugesville. Additionally, in the early 1900s, the waters of Muncy Creek were contaminated with tannery waste products from Muncy Valley and also chemicals. For this reason, the creek was only used for power during this time. Additionally, a methyl alcohol plant, the Nordmont Chemical Works, discharged chemicals into the creek at Nordstown. Other major industries in the watershed in the early part of the 1900s included clay mines and furniture factories.

Biology
From this point downstream to the US Route 220 bridge at Muncy Valley, the creek's main stem is designated as a Coldwater Fishery and a Migratory Fishery. From this point downstream to its mouth, the main stem is designated as a Trout Stocked Fishery and a Migratory Fishery. Wild trout naturally reproduce in the creek from Trout Run downstream to its mouth.

A total of 92 percent of assessed streams in the watershed of Muncy Creek are inhabited by trout. Of the inhabited streams, 82 percent are inhabited only by brook trout, nine percent are inhabited by only brown trout, and nine percent are inhabited by both brook trout and brown trout. A number of tributaries of the creek are designated as high-quality coldwater fisheries. These include Lick Run, Roaring Run, Rock Run, and Spring Run in Lycoming County and Big Run, Trout Run, and a number of others in Sullivan County.

There are some forested areas in the floodplains of Muncy Creek in the United States Geological Survey quadrangle of Hughesville. The Natural Areas Inventory of Lycoming County recommended retaining the natural vegetation in this area to improve water quality.

Recreation
It is possible to canoe on Muncy Creek during snowmelts or shortly after heavier rainstorms. Although the creek is used for canoeing by locals, it is less popular for this use than the nearby Loyalsock Creek. Edward Gertler considers the creek to be especially good for novice canoers. He describes Muncy Creek as a "pleasing but generally mediocre mountain stream" in his book Keystone Canoeing. However, it is only possible to canoe on the creek downstream of the plateau of North Mountain. The difficulty rating of Muncy Creek for canoeing ranges from 1+ to 2.

There is a boat ramp belonging to the Pennsylvania Fish and Boat Commission in the lower reaches of Muncy Creek. It can also serve as a take-out for canoers on the creek.

See also
Chillisquaque Creek
List of rivers of Pennsylvania

References

Rivers of Pennsylvania
Tributaries of the West Branch Susquehanna River
Allegheny Plateau
Rivers of Lycoming County, Pennsylvania
Rivers of Sullivan County, Pennsylvania